The Michelob Ultra Arena, formerly the Mandalay Bay Events Center, is a 12,000-seat multi-purpose indoor arena at the Mandalay Bay Resort and Casino, located on the Las Vegas Strip in Paradise, Nevada. It is owned and operated by MGM Resorts International, and was opened on April 10, 1999. MGM and brewing company Anheuser-Busch entered a naming-rights agreement in 2021, naming the arena after the company's Michelob Ultra beer.

It is the home arena for the Las Vegas Aces of the Women's National Basketball Association and the Las Vegas Desert Dogs of the National Lacrosse League. The arena also hosts a variety of music, sports, and entertainment events.

History
The facility opened as the Mandalay Bay Events Center on April 10, 1999, with a performance by opera singer Luciano Pavarotti. It was his first Las Vegas concert since 1985. The facility opened a month after the Mandalay Bay resort, and included a  floor. The venue was originally planned to include 8,000 seats, but boxing promoter Bob Arum convinced Mandalay Resort Group to increase this to 12,000. The Mandalay Bay Events Center gave Las Vegas its third musical arena, joining the Thomas & Mack Center and the MGM Grand Garden Arena.

MGM Mirage acquired Mandalay Resort Group and the venue in 2005, and was later renamed MGM Resorts International. Around 2014, MGM considered turning the facility into a theater, before deciding to build the Park Theater instead. In February 2021, the venue was renamed Michelob Ultra Arena, through a partnership with brewing company Anheuser-Busch. It is named after the company's Michelob Ultra beer.

Sports
The arena hosts boxing matches, including the high-profile Amir Khan vs. Zab Judah Light welterweight title unification, match on July 23, 2011.

As of July 2018, the Mandalay Bay Events Center has held 31 Ultimate Fighting Championship (UFC) events, starting with UFC 33, and most recently, UFC Fight Night 88. It held the largest UFC weigh-in show in history in conjunction with International Fight Week 2012 ahead of UFC 148 welcoming 10,000 fans. UFC cards in Vegas have since moved to T-Mobile Arena as part of a comprehensive marketing and tenancy agreement.

The 999th episode of WWE Raw was held at the arena on July 16, 2012, the first time the WWE performed at Mandalay Bay.

The first National Basketball Association game on the Las Vegas Strip since 1981 was at the Mandalay Bay Events Center on October 6, 2012, a preseason contest between the Denver Nuggets and the Los Angeles Clippers. The teams returned for preseason games in 2013 and 2014. In 2016, it hosted the NCAA Men's basketball postseason tournament Vegas 16. The NBA and WNBA officially announced on October 17, 2017, that the San Antonio Stars would relocate from San Antonio, Texas, and would be playing at the Mandalay Bay Events Center starting in the 2018 season as the Las Vegas Aces. They played their first home game on May 27, 2018.

The 2016 Spring North American League of Legends Championship Series Finals were hosted at the Mandalay Bay Events Center on April 16 and 17, 2016.

Since 2016, the Evolution Championship Series fighting game tournament has held its final day of competition at the Mandalay Bay Events Center.

The WNBA All-Star Game and related All-Star events were held at the Mandalay Bay Events Center on July 26 and 27, 2019.

On August 29, 2017, the National Lacrosse League (NLL) announced that Las Vegas had been awarded an NLL franchise to begin playing in December 2022 for the 2022–2023 season. The team became known as the Las Vegas Desert Dogs.

Entertainment events
Rock band Journey performed at the arena in December 2000 which was filmed for the Journey 2001 DVD.

VH1 held the first two Rock Honors ceremonies in this facility in 2006 and 2007.

It was the host of Yanni's Yanni Live! The Concert Event, in 2006.

The arena hosted Crüe Fest on August 1, 2008.

It played host to 311's biennial 3-11 Day concert on March 11, 2010. The band played four sets with 60 songs total.

The arena hosted the 2010 revival of the Lilith Fair on July 9.

On August 23, 2010 the arena served as the venue for Miss Universe 2010 where at the conclusion of the event Ximena Navarrete of Mexico was crowned as the winner.

January 28, 2011, Ozzy Osbourne performed as part of his tour for his new album Let Me Hear You Scream.

The cast of Glee were there on the first stop on their Glee Live! In Concert! tour on May 21, 2011.

On May 14, 2017 the arena hosted Miss USA 2017 pageant.

The 25th Billboard Latin Music Awards was held in the Events Center on April 26, 2018.

Latin Grammy Awards
The arena has hosted the Latin Grammy Awards seven times. The Latin Grammys were held at the Mandalay Bay Events Center in 2007 and from 2009 to 2013. The arena hosted the Latin Grammy Awards for a seventh time in 2022

In popular culture
Footage of a boxing match between Oscar De La Hoya and Oba Carr, taking place at the Mandalay Bay Events Center, was used in the 1999 film Play It to the Bone. The final boxing match in the 2006 film Rocky Balboa was also filmed at the venue.

References

External links

1999 establishments in Nevada
Basketball venues in Nevada
Boxing venues in Las Vegas
Buildings and structures in Paradise, Nevada
Convention centers in the Las Vegas Valley
Event venues established in 1999
Indoor arenas in Las Vegas
Las Vegas Aces venues
Las Vegas Desert Dogs
Mixed martial arts venues in Nevada
Music venues in the Las Vegas Valley
Sports venues in Las Vegas
Sports venues completed in 1999